A constitutional referendum was held in Iran on 2 and 3 December 1979. The new Islamic constitution was approved by 99.5% of voters.

The referendum was held by the Council of the Islamic Revolution, because Bazargan's Interim Government—which oversaw the previous referendum—had resigned in protest to the U.S. Embassy hostage crisis.

A day before the referendum, when the mourning of Ashura was practiced, Ayatollah Ruhollah Khomeini said those who will not vote tomorrow, will help Americans and desecrate Shohada (Martyrs).

Alongside Islamic Republican Party, the communist Tudeh Party of Iran urged people to vote yes, expressing its support for "Imam's line"; while Freedom Movement of Iran requested a yes vote on the grounds that the alternative was an anarchy.

Others, including leftists, secular nationalists and Islamist followers of Mohammad Kazem Shariatmadari called for a boycott. The turnout among Sunni minorities in Kurdistan and Sistan and Baluchestan Provinces, as well as Shariatmadari's home Azerbaijan was low and number of votes fell down in comparison to the referandum held in January. Historian Ervand Abrahamian estimates that nearly 17% of the people did not support the constitution.

Background

The supplement to the constitution (fundamental law) adopted in 1907. Some instances of European fundamental law were contradictions with Shia doctrine  but they were accommodated. At that time there were no attempts at developing the Islamic fundamental laws. In 1979, the Pahlavi dynasty was ousted and an Islamic republic was established at the end of March by holding the Iranian Islamic Republic referendum. The first day of April 1979 was entitled as the first day of a "Government of God", with the 2,500 year Persian Empire in Iran was ended by Ayatollah Khomeini. He stated the necessary next step was in ratifying the Constitution. On 12 January 1979, the Assembly of Experts election was held and Ayatollah Khomeini asked Iranians to select their representatives. On 3 and 4 August 1979 the Assembly of Experts as a Constituent assembly commenced activities with 72 representatives from all over of Iran, and Ayatollah Akbar Hashemi Rafsanjani read the message of Ayatollah Khomeini for them that the "Constitution and other laws in this Republic must be based one hundred per cent on Islam." The convocations of the Assembly of Experts lasted until 15 November 1979, and finally the new Islamic constitution was approved by at least two-thirds of the representatives. In June 1979, Ayatollah Khomeini approved the draft by applying minor changes and he stated that the draft must to be submitted to a referendum.

New constitution
The proposed new constitution would make Iran an Islamic republic, introduce direct elections for the presidency, create a unicameral parliament, and require any constitutional changes to go to a referendum.

The new constitution was codified according to Shia Islam. Therefore there was an appendix in which verses of Quran and traditions were cited in support of many articles. Among the applied changes was a chapter on leadership replacing a chapter on monarchy. Two chapters about foreign policy and  mass media was added. Some articles from the previous constitution were preserved, such as equality before the law (Articles 19-20); guarantees of the security of life, property, honor, and domicile (Articles 22, 39); freedom of opinion and choice of profession (Articles 23, 28); the rights to due process (Articles 32-36) and to the privacy of communications (Article 25); and a requirement for public deliberations of the Majlis under normal circumstances (Article 69), as well as parliamentary procedure and definition of the rights and responsibilities of the ministers of the Majlis (Articles. 70, 74, 88-90).

Party policies

Results

References

Aftermath of the Iranian Revolution
Iran
Referendums in Iran
December constitutional referendum
Constitutional referendums
Iranian constitutional referendum
1970s in Iran